"Welcome to the Jungle"  is a song by American rock band Guns N' Roses, featured on their debut album, Appetite for Destruction (1987). It was released as the album's second single initially in the UK in September 1987 then again in October 1988 this time including the US, where it reached number seven on the Billboard Hot 100 and number 24 on the UK Singles Chart.

On the 1987 release, the 7” was backed with a live version of AC/DC's "Whole Lotta Rosie", while the 12” also contained live versions of the band's debut single "It's So Easy" and Bob Dylan's "Knockin' on Heaven's Door".  In 2009, "Welcome to the Jungle" was named the greatest hard rock song of all time by VH1. Rolling Stone listed this on their “500 Greatest Songs of All Time” list.

Background and composition
Axl Rose wrote the lyrics while visiting a friend in Seattle: "It's a big city, but at the same time, it's still a small city compared to L.A. and the things that you're gonna learn. It seemed a lot more rural up there. I just wrote how it looked to me. If someone comes to town and they want to find something, they can find whatever they want." Guitarist Izzy Stradlin summarizes the song as "about Hollywood streets; true to life".

Slash describes the development of the music in his self-titled autobiography. As the band was trying to write new material, Rose remembered a riff Slash had played while he was living in the basement of Slash's mother's house. He played it and the band quickly laid down the foundations for the song, as Slash continued coming up with new guitar parts. "It was really the first thing we all collaborated on…" the guitarist recalled. "In that whole 'discovering ourselves' period from '85 through '86 – when we were living together very haphazardly and getting together and jamming – there was something going on that not a lot of people had. And this song just had this natural feel that was very cool."

The breakdown was based on a song called "The Fake" that Duff McKagan wrote in 1978 for his punk band the Vains. The bassist said it was the first song he ever wrote, and that it was later released as a single by that band.

According to Slash, the song was written in approximately three hours.

Rose claimed the lyrics were inspired by an encounter he and a friend had with a homeless man while they were coming out of a bus into New York. Trying to put a scare into the young runaways, the man yelled at them, "You know where you are? You're in the jungle baby; you're gonna die!" "It was a very telling lyric – just the stark honesty of it," said Slash. "If you lived in Los Angeles – and lived in the trenches, so to speak – you could relate to it."

Reception
"Welcome to the Jungle" was ranked number 19 in Martin Popoff's book The Top 500 Heavy Metal Songs of All Time. It was also named the second greatest metal song by VH1 in 2008. In 2006, VH1 also placed the song at number 26 on its list of the "100 Greatest Songs of the 80s" and, in 2009, the channel ranked it the greatest hard rock song of all time. It was ranked number 467 in Rolling Stones "500 Greatest Songs of All Time" list in 2004, number 473 in 2010, and number 491 in 2021. (Rolling Stone readers named it "the greatest sports anthem" in 2009) and number 764 in Qs 's "1001 Best Songs Ever". Paste and Kerrang both named it Guns N' Roses' greatest song. It was named the "greatest song about Los Angeles" in a 2006 Blender poll.

"'Welcome to the Jungle' had this high velocity, high impact, aggressive delivery," Slash observed. "But there were a lot of emotional subtleties in the song that the band really grasped. If Axl went here, the band went with him. I really love that about the band and the music and how it all came together. There was something magical in all of that."

Cash Box called it a "solid, satisfying chunk of metal."

Music video
Geffen Records was having a hard time selling the video to MTV. David Geffen made a deal with the network, and the video was aired only one time around 5:00AM on a Sunday morning. As soon as the video was aired, the networks received numerous calls from people wanting to see the video again.

In spite of the early morning airtime, the song's music video caught viewers' attention and quickly became MTV's most requested video. The video in question (directed by Nigel Dick) begins with a shot of Axl Rose disembarking a bus in Los Angeles and a drug dealer (portrayed by Izzy) is seen trying to sell his merchandise while Rose rejects it. As Rose stops to watch a television through a store window, clips of the band playing live can be seen and Slash can also be seen briefly, sitting against the store's wall and drinking from a clear glass bottle in a brown paper bag. By the end of the video Rose has transformed into a city punk, wearing the appropriate clothing, after going through a process similar to the Ludovico technique.

During an interview with Rolling Stone magazine about the music video, Guns N' Roses' manager at the time, Alan Niven, said that he "came up with the idea of stealing from three movies: Midnight Cowboy, The Man Who Fell to Earth and A Clockwork Orange."

Uses in TV, film and video games 
The track has been used in numerous Hollywood films and TV. Films that have used it include: 

 The Dead Pool (1988)
 Lean on Me (1989) 
 The Program (1993)
 Selena (1997)
 Megamind (2010)
 The Interview (2014)
 How to Be Single (2016)
 Jumanji: Welcome to the Jungle (2017)
 The Lego Ninjago Movie (2017)
 Jumanji: The Next Level (2019).
Thor: Love and Thunder (2022)

The song was used in 2004 video game Grand Theft Auto: San Andreas on the in-game radio station Radio X. 

It also serves as the unofficial anthem for the Cincinnati Bengals.

Former professional baseball closer Éric Gagné used the song as his entrance music during his career.

Track listings
All songs credited to Guns N' Roses except where noted

Personnel
W. Axl Rose – lead vocals
Slash – lead guitar
Izzy Stradlin – rhythm guitar, backing vocals
Duff McKagan – bass, backing vocals
Steven Adler – drums

Charts

Weekly charts

Year-end charts

Certifications

See also
List of glam metal albums and songs

Notes

External links
"Welcome to the Jungle" music video at VH1 Classic
Complete Guide to GN'R 'Welcome to the Jungle' at Ultimate-Guitar.com

1987 singles
1987 songs
Cincinnati Bengals
Geffen Records singles
Guns N' Roses songs
Music videos directed by Nigel Dick
Songs about drugs
Songs about Los Angeles
Songs about prostitutes
Songs written by Axl Rose
Songs written by Izzy Stradlin
Songs written by Duff McKagan
Songs written by Slash (musician)